Bowman Lake State Park is a  state park located in Chenango County, New York. The park is located in the Town of McDonough, north of the community of East McDonough.

History
The land that was to become Bowman Lake State Park was originally part of the region's reforestation lands, which were acquired by the state beginning in 1929. Under the management of the New York Conservation Department, 200 campsites were established around Bowman Lake in 1962, in addition to a day use area, sand beach, and boat launch. The property was transferred to the State Parks and Recreation Commission in 1966 to be operated as a state park.

Park description
Bowman Lake State Park features one of the largest campgrounds in central New York, containing 188 campsites for tents and trailers, as well as several rustic cabins. The park's facilities also include a boat launch, a beach, picnic tables, and a nature center. Trails are available for hiking, biking, cross-country skiing, and snowmobiling. The Finger Lakes Trail also passes through the park.

A variety of wildlife, including 103 species of birds, may be viewed at the park.

See also
 List of New York state parks

References

External links
 New York State Parks: Bowman Lake State Park
 Unofficial Volunteer Website for Bowman Lake State Park

State parks of New York (state)
Parks in Chenango County, New York
Protected areas established in 1966
1966 establishments in New York (state)